Mesorhizobium caraganae is a gram-negative, aerobic, non-spore-forming, motile bacteria from the genus of Mesorhizobium which was isolated from root nodules of Caragana microphyllain in the Beipiao City in the Liaoning Province in China.

References

External links
Type strain of Mesorhizobium caraganae at BacDive -  the Bacterial Diversity Metadatabase

Phyllobacteriaceae
Bacteria described in 2008